Gopal Krishna is a 1979 Bollywood religious film  produced by Tarachand Barjatya under the banner of Rajshri production and directed by Vijay Sharma.

Cast
Sachin... Krishna - Adult 
Zarina Wahab... Radha 
Satyajeet... Balraam
Manher Desai... Maharaj Kans 
Master Sandeep... Krishna - Child 
Rita Bhaduri... Yashoda 
Jeevan... Narad Muni 
Mahipal... Bhagwan Vishnu 
Paintal... Friend of Krishna
 Surender Sharma... Nanda -Krishna's Foster Father

Soundtrack 
All songs and lyrics were composed by music director Ravindra Jain.

1. Teri Maya Ka Na Paya Koi Par (Ravindra Jain)

2. Tu Man Ki Ati Bhori (Chandrani Mukharji)

3. Neer Bharan Ka Karke Bahana (Yasudas & Hemlata)

4. Koi Mat Jariyo Ri Mere Bhag (Hemlata)

5. Govinda Gopala (Hemlata)

6. Aayo Fagun Hathilo (Jaspal Singh & Hemlata)

External links
 

1979 films
1970s Hindi-language films
Indian fantasy films
Rajshri Productions films
Films based on the Mahabharata
1970s fantasy films